Epidendrum paniculatum (gloss:  paniculate upon a tree) is a species of orchid in the genus Epidendrum.

Taxonomy
Reichenbach determined that E. fastigiatum Lindl. 1853, E. floribundum Kunth 1816, and E. paniculatum Ruiz & Pav. (1798), including E. cuspidatum Lindl. (1853), E. laevi Lindl. (1844), and E. longicrure Lindl. (1853) were three separate species.  Because E. fastigiatum Lindl. 1853 and E. paniculatum Ruiz & Pav. (1798) had the lower part of the inflorescences covered in imbricate sheathes, Reichenbach placed them in the section Amphiglotium Polycladia.  Because E. floribundum Kunth 1816 had no imbricate sheaths on the lower part of the inflorescence, Reichenbach placed it in the subsection Euepidendrum Planifolia Paniculata.

According to the World Checklist of Selected Plant Families published by Kew, E. fastigiatum Lindl. 1853 and E. floribundum Kunth 1816 are both synonyms for Epidendrum paniculatum Ruiz & Pav. (1798).

In 1984, the diploid chromosome number of an individual identified as E. floribundum Kunth was determined as 2n = 40.

References

External links

Epidendrum subsect. Paniculata
Epidendrum sect. Polycladia
Orchids of Central America
Orchids of Belize